Julius Marinus was the father of Roman Emperor Philip the Arab and Philip's brother Gaius Julius Priscus.

Life
He was deified by his son. Scholar Pat Southern writes that this deification was unusual because Marinus was not an emperor, but it gave Philip's reign more legitimacy.

In life Marinus was possibly of some importance. By descent from Marinus, Philip held Roman citizenship.

References

3rd-century Romans
3rd-century Arabs
3rd-century Asian people
Deified Roman people
Marinus, Julius
Philip the Arab